Sabatinca ianthina is a species of moth belonging to the family Micropterigidae. It was described by Alfred Philpott in 1921. It is endemic to New Zealand. This species can be found on both the North and the South Islands from the Hawkes Bay down to Westland. The adults of this species are on the wing from the end of September until the middle of December. Although this species resembles Zealandopterix zonodoxa, S. ianthina is a larger moth and the range of the two species only overlaps in White Pine Bush Scenic Reserve in the Hawke’s Bay.

Taxonomy 
This species was described by Alfred Philpott in 1921 from specimens collected at Dun Mountain near Nelson. Adults were found on a rocky slope covered with various species of mosses and liverworts. They were resting on Gahnia species, although it seems this species does not have any closer affinities to this plant. The holotype specimen is held at the New Zealand Arthropod Collection.

Description

Larvae associated this species have yet to be collected.

Philpott described this species as follows:
Although this species resembles Zealandopterix zonodoxa, S. ianthina is a larger moth and the range of the two species only overlaps in White Pine Bush Scenic Reserve in the Hawke’s Bay.

Distribution 
This species is endemic to New Zealand. This species can be found on both the North and the South Islands from the Hawkes Bay down to Westland from altitudes ranging from sea level up to 1400 m.

Behaviour 
The adults of this species are on the wing from the end of September until the middle of December.

Host species 
The larvae of this species likely feed on foliose liverwort species with the adults likely feeding on fern spores or sedge pollen.

References

Micropterigidae
Moths described in 1921
Endemic fauna of New Zealand
Moths of New Zealand
Taxa named by Alfred Philpott
Endemic moths of New Zealand